The Battle of Kirkhbulakh or Battle of Kirbulakh was fought in 1751 in the village of Kirkhbulakh between Georgian and Azad Khan Afghan armies commanded by Heraclius II and Azad-Khan respectively. Battle began with the advantage of the warlord Azad Khan, but with brilliant leadership of King Heraclius Georgians managed to rout the enemy.

Background
Azad-Khan Afghan, the Khan of Tabriz had ended up in far western Persia many hundreds of miles away from his native land during the reign of Nader Shah. Following the latter's death, he turned into a lone warlord, as well as a pretender to the Persian throne, looking forward to extend his dominion. He took advantage of the defeat of the Georgians against Haji Chalabi Khan. Putting his army under the command of a certain Mohammad Khan, evicted from Georgia earlier, the siege of Yerevan was ordered. Heraclius quickly assembled a small army and marched to lift the siege. Upon hearing about this, Azad-Khan abandoned the siege of the city, which was already devastated. According to Papuna Orbeliani's accounts:

King Erekle, ordering his men to harvest the crops to deal with the hunger in the city, set up defensive positions at the narrow passage of the nearby village of Kirkhbulakhi (in some sources Kirbulakhi). 
Meanwhile, Azad-Khan had managed to assemble an 18,000-men strong army. He attacked Erekle's fortifications on 28 July 1751.

Battle
The battle started off with Azad Khan gaining an advantage over the Georgians by pushing back their left flank. King Erekle II ordered his cavalry to dismount from their horses to allow them to maneuver in a narrow corridor and ordered his musketeers to hold their fire and wait for his command. When the Georgians were virtually encircled, Heraclius ordered an all out attack at the center of Azad Khan's army, killing Mohammad Khan instantly. The Georgians were able to exploit the confusion and break through the Khan's encirclement with a fierce counter-attack. King Irakli ordered his men to run down the retreating army of Azad Khan, which they did for as far as 30 kilometers, killing and capturing many on their way.

Aftermath
The resonance of the decisive battle fought in Kirkhbulakh was apparent in all of the neighboring Caucasian khanates. The renegade city-states went back under the Georgian authority, while Azad-Khan opted for a "friendly relationship" with regard to his northwestern neighbor. King Heraclius could now focus on addressing his losses in his previous war with Haji Chalabi as well as preventing incursions of Dagestani tribes and putting an end to unstable inner politics.

References

Kirkhbulakh
Invasions of Georgia (country)
Kirkhbulakh